Marcelle Gabarrus (born 8 February 1929) is a French sprinter. She competed in the women's 200 metres at the 1952 Summer Olympics.

References

External links
 

1929 births
Possibly living people
Athletes (track and field) at the 1952 Summer Olympics
French female sprinters
Olympic athletes of France
Sportspeople from Toulouse
Olympic female sprinters
20th-century French women